Glenea bryanti is a species of beetle in the family Cerambycidae. It was described by Stephan von Breuning in 1958. It is known from Borneo.

References

bryanti
Beetles described in 1958